Homebush Homestead is building in Homebush, New Zealand, belonging to the early pioneering Deans family. The previous homestead was severely damaged during the 2010 Canterbury earthquake. It was demolished soon after. It has since been replaced by a new building, designed by Athfield Architects Limited.

History 
The original triple-brick homestead was built by the New Zealand-famous Deans family, who were early pioneer settlers of the Canterbury region. The groundwork began in the 1880s and was completed by 1903. It was originally entered under Heritage New Zealand as a Category II historic place (#7102).

As well as the homestead, many other historic structures are also located on the station.

 The water turbine, which was constructed in 1880 and incorporated into its own room in the stables, was used to drive farm machinery such as saw bench, chaff cutter, wheat mill, whetstone, and seed dresser. A  underground brick tunnel was built to bring water from the dammed up Waianiwaniwa River down to a circular brick well in which the turbine sits. Another tunnel was also built. The turbine is thought to be the only one of its type in New Zealand and may be the only one in the world. A water tower was built outside the entrance to the turbine room and still stands.

 The stables are located south of the homestead.

 The brick woolshed, as well as the shearers' quarters (brick house to the north of the shed) can be seen from the main road at the intersection of Deans Road and Bangor/Homebush Road.

2010 Canterbury earthquake 
On 4 September 2010, the original brick homestead was left badly damaged, with the second storey partially collapsing. The occupants, Jim and Rev. Louise Deans who were in the second storey at the time of the earthquake, were able to escape without injury. In November 2010, the homestead was demolished.

Tourism

Film 
Homebush's forests (located in the homestead gardens) were used as a filming location for the 2005 Narnia film, The Lion, The Witch and the Wardrobe.

Gardens 
The eight-acre garden was first planted out in the early 1850s and has been developed by the Deans family over the last 172 years. Trees were planted very early and provide a frame for the sweeping lawns, some of which have registered in the local ordinances and are recorded in books of nationally and internationally significant trees.

The avenue of Atlantic cedars up the driveway were planted in 1913.

In the 1920s and 30s, James Deans planted over a thousand different species of rhododendrons under the trees in the style of Bodnant in Northern Wales.

The circular orchard is an interesting and rare feature of the garden. It was planted out in holly in the early 1850s as a sheltered vegetable garden and tree nursery. Now it houses old roses and different varieties of fruit trees and bushes.

Museum 
Even before the earthquake devastated the homestead, group tours and open days still take place. A museum is also available for viewing in the old stables, containing a collection of pioneering country life on the Canterbury Plains. The collection includes vintage farming and mining machinery, military and sporting memorabilia, and a broad collection of the everyday life of our forebears. There is also the unique Dayton, Ohio water turbine, the only known one that it is still in-situ in the world.

References 

Historic homes in New Zealand
Selwyn District
Houses completed in 1903